The Library Services and Technology Act (LSTA) was signed on October 1, 1996, by United States President Bill Clinton. LSTA is a United States federal library grant program. Its roots come from the Library Services Act that was first enacted in 1956. LSTA replaced the Library Services and Construction Act (LSCA) that was first enacted in 1962. The new act was developed by the American Library Association (ALA) and other library groups.

Many changes occurred with the passage of LSTA. The original act, Library Services and Construction Act (LSCA), allocated funds for construction of buildings, but LSTA has an emphasis on technology. The new priority is the creation of technological infrastructure. Another change that occurred with the passage of LSCA was the responsibility of library services. This responsibility was originally a part of the Department of Education. It was moved to the newly created, independent federal agency called the Institute of Museum and Library Services (IMLS). The range of libraries served also changed with the enactment of LSTA. Originally, public libraries were primarily served by LSCA. With the passage of LSTA, all types of libraries are served, including public, school, academic, and special.

Not all initiatives under LSCA have changed with the enactment of LSTA. Priorities, like services to the under-served and rural areas, are still supported.

LSCA is a federally funded state-based program generally administered by the state library of each state.  Specific funding categories are set by each state based on a long-range plan filed with the IMLS.

State Libraries LSTA Resources and Five-Year Plans 
 Alaska State Library - LSTA Landing Page
 AK 2013-2017 Plan
 Alabama State Library - LSTA Landing Page
 AL 2013-2017 Plan
 Arkansas State Library - LSTA Landing Page
 AR 2013-2017 Plan
 Arizona State Library - LSTA Landing Page
 AZ 2013-2017 Plan
 California LSTA Landing Page
 CA 2013-2017 Plan
 Colorado LSTA Landing Page
 CO 2013-2017 Plan
 Connecticut State Library - LSTA Landing Page
 CT 2013-2017 Plan
 Delaware State Library - LSTA Landing Page
 DE 2013-2017 Plan
 District of Columbia - LSTA Landing Page
 DC 2013-2017 Plan
 State Library of Florida - LSTA Landing Page
 FL 2018-22 Plan
 Georgia State Library - LSTA Landing Page
 GA 2013-2017 Plan
 Hawaii State Library - LSTA Landing Page
 HI 2013-2017 Plan
 Iowa State Library - LSTA Landing Page
 IA 2013-2017 Plan
 Idaho State Library - LSTA Landing Page
 ID 2013-2017 Plan
 Illinois State Library - LSTA Landing Page
 IL 2013-2017 Plan
 Indiana State Library - LSTA Landing Page
 IN 2013-2017 Plan
 Kansas State Library - LSTA Landing Page
 KS 2013-2017 Plan
 Kentucky State Library - LSTA Landing Page
 KY 2013-2017 Plan
 Louisiana State Library - LSTA Landing Page
 LA 2013-2017 Plan
 Massachusetts State Library - LSTA Landing Page
 MA 2013-2017 Plan
 Maryland State Library - LSTA Landing Page
 MD 2015 Handout
 Maine State Library - LSTA Landing Page
 ME 2013-2017 Plan
 Michigan State Library - LSTA Landing Page
 MI 2018 Report
 MI 2013-2017 Plan
 Minnesota State Library - LSTA Landing Page
 MN 2013-2017 Plan
 Missouri State Library - LSTA Landing Page (cached version)
 MO 2013-2017 Plan (cached version)
 Mississippi State Library - LSTA Landing Page
 MS 2013-2017 Plan
 Montana State Library - LSTA Landing Page
 MT 2013-2017 Plan
 Nebraska State Library - LSTA Landing Page
 NE 2013-2017 Plan
 Nevada State Library - LSTA Landing Page
 NV 2013-2017 Plan
 New Hampshire State Library - LSTA Landing Page
 NH 2013-2017 Plan
 New Jersey State Library - LSTA Landing Page
 NJ 2013-2017 Plan
 New Mexico State Library - LSTA Landing Page
 NM 2013-2017 Plan
 New York State Library - LSTA Landing Page
 NY 2012-2017 Plan
 North Carolina State Library - LSTA Landing Page
 NC 2013-2017 Plan
 North Dakota State Library - LSTA Landing Page
 ND 2012-2018 Plan
 Ohio (State Library of Ohio) - LSTA Landing Page
 OH 2013-2017 Plan
 Oklahoma State Library - LSTA Landing Page
 OK 2013-2017 Plan
 Oregon State Library - LSTA Landing Page
 OR 2013-2017 Plan
 Pennsylvania State Library - LSTA Landing Page
 PA 2013-2017 Plan
 Rhode Island State Library - LSTA Landing Page
 RI 2013-2017 Plan
 South Carolina State Library - LSTA Landing Page
 SC 2013-2017 Plan
 South Dakota State Library - LSTA Landing Page
 SD 2013-2017 Plan
 Tennessee State Library - LSTA Landing Page
 TN 2013-2017 Plan
 Texas State Library - LSTA Landing Page
 TX 2013-2017 Plan
 Utah State Library - LSTA Landing Page
 UT 2013-2017 Plan
 Virginia State Library - LSTA Landing Page
 VA 2013-2017 Plan
 Vermont State Library - LSTA Landing Page
 VT 2013-2017 Plan
 Washington State Library - LSTA Landing Page
 WA 2012-2017 Plan
 Wisconsin State Library - LSTA Landing Page
 WI 2013-2017 Plan
 West Virginia State Library
 WV 2013-2017 Plan
 Wyoming State Library - LSTA Landing Page
 WY 2013-2017 Plan

Notes

Other Resources 
American Library Association, Fight to Defend Federal Funding for Libraries

Acts of the 104th United States Congress
Library law